Ozarkia is a genus of North American leptonetids that was first described by J. Ledford in 2011.

Species
 it contains nine species, all found in the United States:
Ozarkia alabama (Gertsch, 1974) (type) – USA
Ozarkia apachea (Gertsch, 1974) – USA
Ozarkia archeri (Gertsch, 1974) – USA
Ozarkia arkansa (Gertsch, 1974) – USA
Ozarkia blanda (Gertsch, 1974) – USA
Ozarkia georgia (Gertsch, 1974) – USA
Ozarkia iviei (Gertsch, 1974) – USA
Ozarkia novaegalleciae (Brignoli, 1979) – USA
Ozarkia serena (Gertsch, 1974) – USA

See also
 List of Leptonetidae species

References

Araneomorphae genera
Leptonetidae
Spiders of the United States